Dagmar Stelberg (born 21 September 1958) is a German handball player who played for the West German national team. She was born in Engelskirchen. She represented West Germany at the 1984 Summer Olympics in Los Angeles, where the West German team placed fourth.

References

External links

1958 births
Living people
Sportspeople from Cologne (region)
German female handball players
Olympic handball players of West Germany
Handball players at the 1984 Summer Olympics
People from Oberbergischer Kreis